Tonino Valerii (20 May 1934 – 13 October 2016) was an Italian film director, most known for his Spaghetti Westerns. Tonino (Antonio) Valerii started his film career as an assistant director on Sergio Leone's A Fistful of Dollars, before moving on to direct by himself. Among his best-known films are Day of Anger (1967) The Price of Power (1969), My Dear Killer (1972), A Reason to Live, a Reason to Die (1972) and My Name Is Nobody (1973), starring Henry Fonda and Terence Hill.

In 1970, he directed A Girl Called Jules, which was entered into the 20th Berlin International Film Festival.

He died on 13 October 2016 in a clinic in Rome at the age of 82.

Filmography

Films

Other contributions

References

Footnotes

Sources

External links

1934 births
2016 deaths
People from Teramo
Italian-language film directors
Italian film directors
Spaghetti Western directors
Italian male screenwriters